Jakhu Temple (also Jakhoo Temple) is an ancient temple in Shimla, Himachal Pradesh, India, dedicated to the Hindu deity Lord Hanuman. Each year, a festival is held on Dussehra, before 1972 the festival used to be held at Annadale. Shri Hanuman Jakhu is a statue situated in the temple premises which is one of the tallest in the world.   

According to the Ramayana, Hanuman stopped at the location to rest while searching for the Sanjivni Booti to revive Lakshmana. A giant 108-feet-high idol of Hanuman was unveiled at Jakhu Hanuman temple on 4 November 2010. The cost of construction was Rs 1.5 crores. The public unveiling was officiated by Abhishek Bachchan.     

The temple is accessible by foot, horse, taxi or ropeway. The Jakhu Ropeway is an aerial lift that links a point near the centre of Shimla to the temple. It was developed by Jagson International Limited and opened in 2017.

Gallery

References

Tourist attractions in Shimla
Hindu temples in Himachal Pradesh
Buildings and structures in Shimla
Hanuman temples
Temples_in_Shimla